Andoni Ortuzar Arruabarrena (born 13 July 1962) is a Spanish Basque politician and journalist, and the president of the Basque Nationalist Party.

Early life 

Andoni Ortuzar was born on 13 July 1962 in Sanfuentes, in the mining zone (Biscay) in Spain. He studied the "sciences of information", branch of journalism, at the University of the Basque Country. At the end of his career, he became editor of the Radio Popular de Bilbao.

In 1981, the newspaper Deia where he remained until 1987. At Deia, he was head of the Labor and Euskadi-Politics sections. The ELA activist belonged to the works council.

References

1962 births
Basque Nationalist Party politicians
Living people
People from Abanto y Ciérbana-Abanto Zierbena
Deia (newspaper)